Right by Your Side may refer to:
 Right by Your Side (Eurythmics song)
 Right by Your Side (Jimmy Barnes song)
 Right by Your Side (N-Force and Darren Styles song)
 "Right by Your Side", a 2011 song by James Morrison from The Awakening